This is a list of electoral results for the electoral district of Ballarat in Victorian state elections.

Members for Ballarat

Election results

Elections in the 1950s

Elections in the 1940s

 Preferences were not distributed.

 Preferences were not distributed.

Elections in the 1930s

Elections in the 1920s

References

Victoria (Australia) state electoral results by district